Soroe Maersk is a container ship. She was launched on 23 April 1999.

Soroe is powered by a B&W 2 stroke engine. This engine is DFM powered and has an output of 81600 bhp at 91 RPM. She has a maximum speed of 25 knots. The cargo container load is 9,640 TEU.

References

External links 
https://web.archive.org/web/20120223120538/http://www.maersk.com/Pages/default.aspx
Picture of the Ship
Video: Skagen Mærsk twisting in a storm

Container ships
1999 ships
Ships of the Maersk Line